The 2009 Bulgarian Cup Final was the 69th final of the Bulgarian Cup. The final was played at the Georgi Asparuhov Stadium in Sofia on 26 May 2009, and marked the first time that the final has been staged at this stadium.

The match was contested by Litex Lovech, who beat Minyor Pernik 1–0 in their semi-final, and Pirin Blagoevgrad who beat Levski Sofia 1–0. The match was Litex's seventh Bulgarian Cup final, and Pirin's fourth.

Litex Lovech won the final 3–0, with goals from Wilfried Niflore, Doka Madureira and Krum Bibishkov, claiming their fourth Bulgarian Cup.

Match

Details

See also
2008–09 A Group

References 

Bulgarian Cup finals
Cup
PFC Litex Lovech matches
OFC Pirin Blagoevgrad matches